Furuki (written: 古木 or 古城) is a Japanese surname. Notable people with the surname include:

, Japanese voice actress
, Japanese baseball player

Japanese-language surnames